Durno or Logie Durno, located  north west of Inverurie in Aberdeenshire, Scotland, is the site of a Roman marching camp, first discovered by aerial photography in July 1975 and excavated in 1976 and 1977.

The exceptional size of the camp at Durno has led to it being suggested as the place where Agricola assembled his forces before the Battle of Mons Graupius in AD 84, though the evidence for this has been criticised as largely circumstantial.

Notable People
 Dr William Mackie FRSE LLD (1856–1932) physician and noted amateur geologist, born here.

References

Bibliography
 
 
 
 

History of Aberdeenshire
Archaeological sites in Aberdeenshire
Roman fortified camps in Scotland
Scheduled monuments in Scotland